Maud-Éva Copy (born 6 November 1992) is a French handball player who plays for Metz Handball.

Achievements 
Championnat de France
Silver Medalist: 2017
Coupe de France:
Winner: 2016

References

French female handball players
1992 births
Living people
Sportspeople from Brest, France